Lavysas is a lake in southern Lithuania, Varena district, about  south of Perloja and  southwest of Varena, surrounded by the Dainava forest. The lake is of glacial origin, thermokarst, and forms an oval shape. The shores are sandy and covered with coniferous forests. The southern coast on the other hand is swampy. The lake collects the water from two streams, the Merkys and its tributary the Lavysa. Located on the west coast is the village of Lavyso. Close to the lake are many campsites and rest houses.

Lakes of Lithuania